Salem is a city in Salem County, in the U.S. state of New Jersey. It is the county seat of Salem County, the state's most rural county. The name Salem, in both the city and county, is derived from the Hebrew word shalom, meaning peace. As of the 2020 United States census, the city's population was 5,296, an increase of 150 (+2.9%) from the 2010 census count of 5,146, which in turn reflected a decrease of 711 (−12.1%) from the 5,857 counted in the 2000 census. Salem is part of the Delaware Valley or Philadelphia greater metropolitan area. 

The town and colony of Salem was laid out in 1675 by John Fenwick and the community was given permission to choose officers in October 1693. It was incorporated on February 21, 1798, as part of the initial group of 104 townships established by the New Jersey Legislature. On February 25, 1858, it was reincorporated as Salem City.

Salem had the second-highest property tax rate in New Jersey, with an equalized rate of 6.519% in 2020, compared to 3.476% in Salem County and a statewide average of 2.279%.

History
Salem was founded by John Fenwick, a Quaker. Fenwick had been involved in a financial dispute with an Edward Byllynge, another Quaker, who had received the undivided portion of New Jersey territory that James Stuart, Duke of York had granted to Lord John Berkeley in 1664. Berkeley had sold his share to Byllynge in 1675 for 1,000 pounds, but Byllynge had become bankrupt and so had the property turned over to Fenwick to hold for Byllynge and his assigns in trust. Byllynge and Fenwick came to disagree over the property.

William Penn was asked to adjudicate the matter and he awarded 90% of the claim to Byllynge and the remaining 10% and a cash settlement to Fenwick for his share. Fenwick was dissatisfied with Penn's judgement and refused to abide by the decision; essentially Fenwick had no assurance that a previously bankrupt man would convey ten percent of the net proceeds of the future venture since he had not even paid the adjudicated cash settlement. So Fenwick organized a colony of settlers and sailed to the Delaware Bay where he settled as Patroon on the eastern shore near the abandoned Swedish settlement of Fort Nya Elfsborg and set himself up as the local governor of the fifth Tenth (approximately 20% of the original Edward Byllynge property), issuing land patents and enforcing his own laws in defiance of Byllynge and Penn. Byllynge countered by suing Fenwick, causing uncertainty in the chain of land title. The economic damages to those who controlled property within and near Salem caused many injured persons over the next decade to declare a long line of complaints and lawsuits in the colonial courts. To preserve Salem, its inhabitants and their property, Fenwick remained under arrest for months until copies of documents proving his claims were obtained from England. Fenwick ultimately proved the right of his claim in the court of Dominion Governor Andros, and returned to govern the Salem tenth by 1689. Salem remained as a settlement and continued growing.

In 1778, the British launched an assault against the local American militia in what became known as the Salem Raid.  During that assault, Judge William Hancock of the King's Court who was presiding at the County Courthouse at the beginning of the American Revolutionary War, was accidentally killed by the British troops as part of the assault that became known as the Hancock House Massacre.  After the war concluded, treason trials were held at the county courthouse where suspected Loyalists were put on trial for having allegedly aided the British raid of Salem.  Four men were convicted and sentenced to death for treason; however, they were pardoned by Governor William Livingston and exiled from New Jersey.

Salem was formally incorporated on February 21, 1798, as one of the state's initial group of 104 townships by the New Jersey Legislature's Township Act of 1798.

The Old County Courthouse was the site of the legend of Colonel Robert Gibbon Johnson proving the edibility of the tomato. According to legend, Colonel Johnson stood upon the courthouse steps in 1820 and ate tomatoes in front of a large amazed crowd assembled to watch him do so. However, the legend did not appear in print until 1948 and modern scholars doubt the veracity of this story.

Historical buildings
The Old Salem County Courthouse serves today as the administrative offices for Salem City. It is the oldest active courthouse in New Jersey and is the second-oldest courthouse in continuous use in the United States. The Courthouse was erected in 1735 during the reign of King George II using locally manufactured bricks. The building was enlarged in 1817 and additionally enlarged and remodeled in 1908.  Its distinctive bell tower is essentially unchanged and the original bell sits in the courtroom.

Geography
Salem is located along the Salem River. According to the United States Census Bureau, the city had a total area of 2.81 square miles (7.29 km2), including 2.34 square miles (6.07 km2) of land and 0.47 square miles (1.22 km2) of water (16.73%).

The city borders the Salem County municipalities of Elsinboro Township, Lower Alloways Creek Township, Mannington Township, Pennsville Township and Quinton Township.

Climate
The climate in the area is characterized by hot, humid summers and generally mild to cool winters.  According to the Köppen Climate Classification system, Salem has a humid subtropical climate, abbreviated "Cfa" on climate maps.

Demographics

2010 census

The Census Bureau's 2006–2010 American Community Survey showed that (in 2010 inflation-adjusted dollars) median household income was $25,682 (with a margin of error of +/− $5,287) and the median family income was $38,286 (+/− $5,682). Males had a median income of $47,708 (+/− $9,641) versus $32,236 (+/− $5,778) for females. The per capita income for the borough was $17,733 (+/− $2,366). About 26.5% of families and 28.4% of the population were below the poverty line, including 43.4% of those under age 18 and 10.9% of those age 65 or over.

2000 census
As of the 2000 U.S. census, there were 5,857 people, 2,383 households, and 1,463 families residing in the city. The racial makeup of the city was 37.46% White, 56.77% African American, 0.60% Native American, 0.24% Asian, 1.38% from other races, and 3.55% from two or more races. Hispanic or Latino of any race were 4.88% of the population.

There were 2,383 households, out of which 32.9% had children under the age of 18 living with them, 27.7% were married couples living together, 29.0% had a female householder with no husband present, and 38.6% were non-families. 34.1% of all households were made up of individuals, and 14.2% had someone living alone who was 65 years of age or older. The average household size was 2.43 and the average family size was 3.10.

The population was spread out, with 31.0% under the age of 18, 9.1% from 18 to 24, 25.4% from 25 to 44, 20.6% from 45 to 64, and 14.0% who were 65 years of age or older. The median age was 34 years. For every 100 females, there were 80.7 males. For every 100 females age 18 and over, there were 73.6 males.

The median income for a household in the city was $25,846, and the median income for a family was $29,699. Males had a median income of $35,389 versus $24,354 for females. The per capita income for the city was $13,559. About 24.7% of families and 26.6% of the population were below the poverty line, including 35.3% of those under age 18 and 12.1% of those age 65 or over.

Government

Local government
Salem is governed under the City form of New Jersey municipal government. The city is one of 15 municipalities (of the 564) statewide that use this form of government. The government is comprised of the Mayor and the eight-member City Council. The mayor is elected at-large to a three-year term of office. The City Council is comprised of eight members, with four members representing one of two wards, East and West. Council members are elected on a staggered basis to four-year terms of office, with one seat from each ward up for election each year. All members of the governing body are chosen on a partisan basis as part of the November general election.

, the Mayor of Salem is Democrat Jody Veler, whose term of office ends December 31, 2024. Members of the City Council are Council President Earl R. Gage (D, 2022; West Ward), Council President Pro Tempore Timothy H. Gregory Jr. (D, 2022; East Ward), Sharen A. Cline (D, 2024, East Ward), Robert L. Davis (D, 2023; East Ward), Vaughn Groce (D, 2025, East Ward), Sharon K. Kellum (D, 2024, West Ward), Gail Slaughter (D, 2023; West Ward) and James W. Smith (D, 2025; West Ward).

Ruth Carter was named in October 2013 to fill the seat vacated in the previous month by Bob Johnson, who resigned due to family obligations. Carter served on an interim basis until the November 2014 general election, when she was elected to fill the balance of the term of office through December 2016. Vaughn Groce was chosen in January 2013 to fill the seat of Charles Washington Jr., expiring in December 2013 that was vacated when he took office as mayor.

Federal, state, and county representation
Salem City is located in the 2nd Congressional District and is part of New Jersey's 3rd state legislative district.

 

Salem County is governed by a five-member Board of County Commissioners who are elected at-large to serve three-year terms of office on a staggered basis, with either one or two seats coming up for election each year. At an annual reorganization meeting held in the beginning of January, the board selects a Director and a Deputy Director from among its members. , Salem County's Commissioners (with party, residence and term-end year listed in parentheses) are Director Benjamin H. Laury (R, Elmer, term as commissioner ends December 31, 2024; term as director ends 2022), 
Deputy Director Gordon J. "Mickey" Ostrum, Jr. (R, Pilesgrove Township, term as commissioner ends 2024; term as deputy director ends 2022),  
R. Scott Griscom (R, Mannington Township, 2022), Edward A. Ramsay (R, Pittsgrove Township, 2023) and
Lee R. Ware (D, Elsinboro Township, 2022). Constitutional officers elected on a countywide basis are County Clerk Dale A. Cross (R, 2024),
Sheriff Charles M. Miller (R, 2024) and Surrogate Nicki A. Burke (D, 2023).

Politics
As of March 2011, there were a total of 2,975 registered voters in Salem, of which 1,502 (50.5% vs. 30.6% countywide) were registered as Democrats, 229 (7.7% vs. 21.0%) were registered as Republicans and 1,244 (41.8% vs. 48.4%) were registered as Unaffiliated. There were no voters registered to other parties. Among the city's 2010 Census population, 57.8% (vs. 64.6% in Salem County) were registered to vote, including 80.5% of those ages 18 and over (vs. 84.4% countywide).

In the 2012 presidential election, Democrat Barack Obama received 83.4% of the vote (1,674 cast), ahead of Republican Mitt Romney with 15.4% (309 votes), and other candidates with 1.2% (24 votes), among the 2,022 ballots cast by the city's 3,322 registered voters (15 ballots were spoiled), for a turnout of 60.9%. In the 2008 presidential election, Democrat Barack Obama received 1,635 votes (78.8% vs. 50.4% countywide), ahead of Republican John McCain with 390 votes (18.8% vs. 46.6%) and other candidates with 18 votes (0.9% vs. 1.6%), among the 2,074 ballots cast by the city's 3,141 registered voters, for a turnout of 66.0% (vs. 71.8% in Salem County). In the 2004 presidential election, Democrat John Kerry received 1,266 votes (70.4% vs. 45.9% countywide), ahead of Republican George W. Bush with 506 votes (28.1% vs. 52.5%) and other candidates with 16 votes (0.9% vs. 1.0%), among the 1,799 ballots cast by the city's 2,957 registered voters, for a turnout of 60.8% (vs. 71.0% in the whole county).

In the 2013 gubernatorial election, Democrat Barbara Buono received 55.3% of the vote (538 cast), ahead of Republican Chris Christie with 41.0% (399 votes), and other candidates with 3.7% (36 votes), among the 1,061 ballots cast by the city's 3,201 registered voters (88 ballots were spoiled), for a turnout of 33.1%. In the 2009 gubernatorial election, Democrat Jon Corzine received 731 ballots cast (66.3% vs. 39.9% countywide), ahead of Republican Chris Christie with 241 votes (21.8% vs. 46.1%), Independent Chris Daggett with 73 votes (6.6% vs. 9.7%) and other candidates with 35 votes (3.2% vs. 2.0%), among the 1,103 ballots cast by the city's 3,101 registered voters, yielding a 35.6% turnout (vs. 47.3% in the county).

Education
The Salem City School District serves public school students in pre-kindergarten through twelfth grade. The district is one of 31 former Abbott districts statewide that were established pursuant to the decision by the New Jersey Supreme Court in Abbott v. Burke which are now referred to as "SDA Districts" based on the requirement for the state to cover all costs for school building and renovation projects in these districts under the supervision of the New Jersey Schools Development Authority.

As of the 2021–22 school year, the district, comprised of three schools, had an enrollment of 1,226 students and 99.0 classroom teachers (on an FTE basis), for a student–teacher ratio of 12.4:1. Schools in the district (with 2021–22 enrollment data from the National Center for Education Statistics) are 
John Fenwick Academy with 358 students in grades PreK-2, 
Salem Middle School with 444 students in grades 3-8 and 
Salem High School with 399 students in grades 9-12.

Public school students from Elsinboro, Lower Alloways Creek Township, Mannington Township and Quinton Township attend the district's high school for grades 9–12 as part of sending/receiving relationships.

The Catholic K–8 school St. Mary Regional School of the Roman Catholic Diocese of Camden closed in 2000, with students redirected to Bishop Guilfoyle Regional Catholic School in Carneys Point, which in turn closed in 2010. Guardian Angels Regional School is a K-8 school that operates under the auspices of the Diocese of Camden and accepts students from Salem. Its PreK-3 campus is in Gibbstown while its 4-8 campus is in Paulsboro.

Salem Community College is in nearby Carneys Point Township.

Transportation
The Port of Salem was designated by the British Crown in 1682 as a port of entry on the Salem River accessible via the Delaware River. It handles a variety of bulk cargo, notably of construction aggregate, break bulk cargo, and containers for clothing, fishing apparel, agricultural produce, and other consumer goods. South Jersey Port Corporation operates the Salem Terminal on a 22-acre complex located west of downtown.

The Glass House Spur of the Salem Branch begins at the Port of Salem and is operated by the Southern Railroad of New Jersey with connections to Conrail's South Jersey/Philadelphia Shared Assets Area operations at Swedesboro.

Roads and highways

State highways passing through Salem include Route 45, which has its southern terminus at its intersection with Route 49. Nearby highways and structures include Interstate 295, the New Jersey Turnpike and the Delaware Memorial Bridge.

Public transportation
NJ Transit offers bus service between the city and Philadelphia on the 401 route and local service on the 468 route.

The Delaware City–Salem Ferry was a seasonal service operating between Barber's Basin and Delaware City, Delaware, until it was rerouted to Fort Mott in 2015 and became the Forts Ferry Crossing.

Notable people

People who were born in, residents of, or otherwise closely associated with Salem include:

 Forman S. Acton (1920–2014), computer scientist, engineer, educator and author
 Collins B. Allen (1866–1953), President of the New Jersey Senate
 Isaac Ambrose Barber (1852–1909), member of the United States House of Representatives from Maryland, serving from 1897 to 1899
 Ephraim Bee (1802–1888), pioneer, blacksmith, and inn-keeper of Doddridge County, West Virginia, which he represented in the West Virginia House of Delegates in 1863 and 1866–1867
 Benjamin H. Brewster (1816–1888), United States Attorney General from 1881 to 1885
 A. B. Brown (born 1965), running back who played for three seasons in the NFL with the New York Jets
 Alexander G. Cattell (1816–1894), United States Senator from New Jersey
 John Chowning (born 1934), musician, inventor and professor who developed FM synthesis
 Henry T. Ellett (1812–1887), member of the United States House of Representatives from Mississippi who died while delivering a welcome address for President Grover Cleveland
 Duke Esper (1868–1910), pitcher who played for nine professional seasons in Major League Baseball
 Gene Foster (born 1942), running back who played for six seasons for the San Diego Chargers
 Johnny Gaudreau (born 1993), professional hockey player for the Columbus Blue Jackets of the NHL
 Goose Goslin (1900–1971), Hall of Fame Major League Baseball player
 William J. Hughes (born 1932), represented New Jersey's 2nd congressional district in the United States House of Representatives
 Orlando Jordan (born 1974), retired professional wrestler in numerous circuits, best known for his stint in WWE where he was a one-time United States Champion
 Anthony Quinton Keasbey, former US attorney for the District of new Jersey
 Lydell Mitchell (born 1949), running back in the National Football League from 1972 to 1980
 Thomas A. Pankok (1931–2022), politician who served in the New Jersey General Assembly from 1982 to 1986, where he represented the 3rd Legislative District
 John R. Patrick (born 1945), business executive, author and innovative leader in the information technology industry
 Charles J. Pedersen (1904–1989), organic chemist and winner of the 1987 Nobel Prize in Chemistry
 John S. Rock (1826–1866), African-American doctor, dentist, abolitionist and lawyer
 Hetty Reckless (1776–1881), abolitionist
 Clement Hall Sinnickson (1834–1919), represented New Jersey's 1st congressional district from 1875 to 1879
 Alice Barber Stephens (1858–1932), painter and engraver, best remembered for her illustrations
 Jonathan Taylor (born 1999), running back for the Indianapolis Colts who set the New Jersey state record with 2,815 rushing yards as a senior at Salem High School
 John Test (1771–1849), member of the United States House of Representatives from Indiana who served from 1829 to 1831
 Hedge Thompson (1780–1828), represented New Jersey's at-large congressional district from 1827 until his death in 1828
 Edward Trenchard (1785–1824), captain of the United States Navy
 John A. Waddington (1911–1981), politician who served as Majority Leader of the New Jersey Senate

See also
 USS Salem (CM-11)

Photo gallery

References

Bibliography
 Shourds, Thomas (1876), History and genealogy of Fenwick's Colony, New Jersey, New Jersey: Bridgeton,

External links

 Salem, New Jersey
 Salem Main Street Program
 
 
 

 
1675 establishments in New Jersey
1798 establishments in New Jersey
Cities in Salem County, New Jersey
City form of New Jersey government
County seats in New Jersey
Populated places established in 1675
Populated places established in 1798
Port cities and towns in New Jersey